PP-31 Gujrat-IV is a Constituency of Provincial Assembly of Punjab.

2018 Elections

General elections are scheduled to be held on 25 July 2018.

See also
 PP-30 Gujrat-III
 PP-32 Gujrat-V

References

Provincial constituencies of Punjab, Pakistan